"Pressing On" is a song by the Christian rock band Relient K, and it is featured on their second album, The Anatomy of the Tongue in Cheek. It is one of the band's most popular songs, and can be heard on Christian radio stations from time to time. The song was written by the band's lead singer Matt Thiessen in 2001.

The song was featured in the Power Rangers: Ninja Storm episode "Looming Thunder", along with "Trademark" from Two Lefts Don't Make a Right...but Three Do. It also appears in Big Air Freestyle, a motocross video game for GameCube and can be heard on at least one episode of the television show Pimp My Ride. The song yet again appears in the episode of What's New, Scooby Doo? called "Gold Paw."

An acoustic version appears on The Creepy EP, along with the studio version. 

While the band no longer plays it at shows for the most part, many concerts are usually filled with shouts of the song's name from fans in the crowd. The band has played the song in the past couple years at some shows, taking half of it and half of "Softer to Me" and playing the two back-to-back.

Music video
A music video was made for this song, and it was released at the same time that the album itself was released. The music video shows the at-the-time four band members as they walked from a van to a building where their video is to be shot. However, the band is instantly swamped by fans. Security guards desperately try to keep the fans away, but the band continues to look forward and walk towards the building anyway. Once they are inside, another fan who awaits them charges in their direction. Two more security guards take the man away as the band shows up on set. An extra scene is added at the end, where the director refers to their music as "Whatever you guys are playing these days". The music video also has many shots of the band performing the song, which are cut into the scenes of them walking through the fans.

On a post to their official message board, Thiessen admitted that the band was originally going to shoot a video for the song "Sadie Hawkins Dance", but had to change to "Pressing On" at the last minute because of a low budget. Having only several days to plan the video, it was pulled together very quickly. "Sadie Hawkins Dance" was to have Gary Coleman in the video originally.

The video is also included on the gold edition of The Anatomy of the Tongue in Cheek.

Video credits

 Matt Thiessen – lead vocals, guitar
 Matt Hoopes – guitar, backing vocals
 Brian Pittman – bass
 Dave Douglas – drums, backing vocals

References

2001 singles
Contemporary Christian songs
Relient K songs
Songs written by Matt Thiessen
2001 songs
Gotee Records singles